Jules Noriac, real name Claude, Antoine, Jules Cairon, (24 April 1827 – 1 October 1882), was a French journalist, playwright, writer, librettist and theatre director.

Biography 
Cairon was first a journalist and columnist in many newspapers. He started successively at the Corsair in 1850, the Gazette de France in 1851, the National Assembly in 1853, then as editor of Le Figaro weekly of which he was one of the main editors. He worked simultaneously with the Revue fantaisiste, the Gazette de Paris, La Silhouette, the Revue des Beaux Arts, L'Univers illustré and became successively chief-editor of the Figaro-programme, the Soleil and the Nouvelles (1865–66).

He also wrote plays, operetta libretti and novels under the pseudonym Jules Noriac.

He was co-managing director of the Théâtre des Variétés from 1856 to 1869 and of the Théâtre des Bouffes-Parisiens from 1868 to 1879.

Jules Noriac was awarded with the Spanish Order of Charles III.

Works 
Tales
1870: Histoire du siège de Paris 
 Les Gens de Paris
 Dictionnaire des amoureux

Novels and short stories
1859: Le 101 Régiment
1860: La Bêtise humaine 
1861: Le Grain de sable 
1863: Les Mémoires d'un baiser 
1863: La Dame à la plume noire
1865: Le Journal d'un flâneur
1866: Le Capitaine Sauvage
 Le Chevalier de Cerny
 La Comtesse de Bruges
 La Falaise d'Houlgate
 Mademoiselle Poucet
 Sur le rail
1862: La Boîte au lait
1873: Le Mouton enragé
1876: La Maison verte

Operettas
1870: Les Baisers d'alentour, Théâtre des Bouffes Parisiens 
1871: Le Barbier de Trouville, music by Charles Lecocq 
1872: la Timbale d'argent, 3 acts, with Eugène Grangé, music by Léon Vasseur, Bouffes Parisiens
1873: la Petite Reine, 3 acts, with Jaime, music by Vasseur, Bouffes Parisiens 
1875: la Branche cassée, 3 acts, with Jules Moinaux, music by Vasseur, Théâtre Taitbout 
1876: la Boîte au lait, operetta in 4 acts, music by Offenbach, Bouffes Parisiens 
1876: Pierrette et Jacquot, 1 act, with Gille, music by Offenbach, Bouffes Parisiens
1877: La Sorrentine, 3 acts, with Moineaux, music by Vasseur, Bouffes Parisiens

External links 
 http://agl87.org/wp/documentation/ils-sont-devenus-celebres-2/jules-noriac/

19th-century French journalists
French male journalists
19th-century French dramatists and playwrights
French opera librettists
French theatre managers and producers
People from Limoges
1827 births
1882 deaths
Deaths from cancer in France
Burials at Montmartre Cemetery
19th-century French male writers